People with the given name Anselmo include:

In arts and media

Music
Anselmo Aieta (1896–1964), Argentinian bandoneon musician, composer and actor
Anselmo Colzani (1918–2006), Italian operatic baritone singer
Anselmo López (musician) (1934–2016), Venezuelan musician
Anselmo Ralph (born 1981), Angolan singer
Anselmo Sacasas (1912–1998), Cuban jazz pianist, bandleader, composer, and arranger

Visual arts
Anselmo Bucci (1887–1955), Italian painter
Anselmo Canerio (died 1575), Italian painter of the Renaissance period
Anselmo Martinez, Tejano artist
Anselmo Piccoli (1915–1992), Argentine abstract artist
Anselmo Sacerdote (1868–1926), Italian painter, engraver, and photographer

Other media
Anselmo Duarte (1920–2009), Brazilian actor
Anselmo L. Figueroa (1861–1915), Mexican-American anarchist political figure and journalist
Anselmo Lorenzo (1841–1914), Spanish author, "the grandfather of Spanish anarchism"
Anselmo Raguileo Lincopil (1922–1992), linguist, researcher and poet of the Mapuche people
Anselmo Suárez y Romero (1818–1878), Cuban writer and novelist

In politics
Anselmo Alliegro y Milá (1899–1961), Cuban politician
Anselmo de la Cruz (1777–1833), Chilean political figure
Anselmo José Braamcamp (1817–1885), Portuguese politician
Anselmo L. Figueroa (1861–1915), Mexican-American anarchist political figure and journalist
Anselmo Guido Pecorari (born 1946), Italian Roman Catholic archbishop and diplomat
Anselmo Sule (1934–2002), Chilean politician

In religion
Anselmo Banduri (  1675–1743), Benedictine scholar, archaeologist and numismatologist
Anselmo Costadoni (1714–1785), Italian Camaldolese monk, historian and theologian
Anselmo da Baggio (died 1073), Pope Alexander II
Anselmo della Pusterla (died 1136), Archbishop of Milan, as Anselm V
Anselmo Zarza Bernal (born 1916), Mexican Roman Catholic Bishop
Anselmo Guido Pecorari (born 1946), Italian Roman Catholic archbishop and diplomat
Anselmo Müller (1932–2011), Brazilian Roman Catholic bishop

In sport

Football (soccer)
Anselmo de Moraes (born 1989), Brazilian football player known by mononym Anselmo
Anselmo Cardoso (born 1984), Portuguese football player known by his mononym Anselmo
Anselmo Eyegue (born 1990), Equatoguinean football player, known by his mononym Anselmo
Anselmo Fernandez (1918–2000), Portuguese architect and football manager
Anselmo Ramon (born 1988), Brazilian football player
Anselmo Ribeiro (born 1974), Cape Verdean football player
Anselmo Robbiati (born 1970), Italian football player
Anselmo Tadeu Silva do Nascimento (born 1980), Brazilian football forward
Anselmo Vendrechovski Júnior (born 1982), Brazilian football player, nicknamed Juninho

Other sports
Anselmo Citterio (1927–2006), Italian cyclist
Anselmo López (basketball) (1910–2004), Spanish basketball coach and administrator
Anselmo Moreno (born 1985), Panamanian professional boxer
Anselmo Silvino (born 1945), Italian weightlifter
Anselmo Viviani (1915–?), Italian cross-country skier

In other fields
Anselmo Banduri (  1675–1743), Benedictine scholar, archaeologist and numismatologist
Anselmo Costadoni (1714–1785), Italian Camaldolese monk, historian and theologian
Anselmo Fernandez (1918–2000), Portuguese architect and football manager
Anselmo Pardo Alcaide (1913–1977), Spanish entomologist
Anselmo Raguileo Lincopil (1922–1992), linguist, researcher and poet of the Mapuche people